So Fresh: The Hits of Autumn 2003  is a compilation of songs that were popular in Australia in summer 2003. It was released on 28 March 2003.

Track listing

 Big Brovaz – "Nu Flow" (3:19)
 Eminem – "Cleanin' Out My Closet" (4:37)
 Christina Aguilera – "Beautiful" (4:00)
 Counting Crows featuring Vanessa Carlton – "Big Yellow Taxi" (3:45)
 Delta Goodrem – "Born to Try" (4:11)
 Avril Lavigne – "Sk8er Boi" (3:23)
 Puddle of Mudd – "She Hates Me" (3:27)
 Jennifer Lopez featuring Jadakiss and Styles P – "Jenny from the Block" (Trackmasters Remix) (3:08)
 Kelly Rowland – "Stole" (4:09)
 Holly Valance – "Naughty Girl" (3:22)
 Ja Rule featuring Bobby Brown – "Thug Lovin'" (4:33)
 In-Grid – "You Promised Me (Tu Es Foutu)" (3:36)
 Pink – "Family Portrait" (3:48)
 LeAnn Rimes – "Life Goes On" (3:33)
 DJ Sammy – "The Boys of Summer" (4:00)
 The Androids – "Do It with Madonna" (3:48)
 Ronan Keating and Lulu – "We've Got Tonight" (Almighty Vocal Edit) (3:32)
 Kylie Minogue – "Come into My World" (4:05)
 Nikki Webster – "24/7 (Crazy 'bout Your Smile)" (3:17)
 Bon Jovi – "Misunderstood" (3:47)

Charts

References

So Fresh albums
2003 compilation albums
2003 in Australian music